Torsten Hägerstrand (October 11, 1916, in Moheda – May 3, 2004, in Lund) was a Swedish geographer. He is known for his work on migration, cultural diffusion and time geography.

A native and resident of Sweden, Hägerstrand was a professor (later professor emeritus) of geography at Lund University, where he received his doctorate in 1953. His doctoral research was on cultural diffusion. His research has helped to make Sweden, and particularly Lund, a major center of innovative work in cultural geography. He also influenced the practice of spatial planning in Sweden through his students.

Early life
Hägerstrand's father was a teacher at a remote elementary school and the family lived at the school. Hägerstrand recalled that his early education was based on the pedagogical ideas of Swiss educator Johann Pestalozzi. Several of Hägerstrand's students speculated that his holistic and visionary thinking was rooted in his early education: He was taught local geography, history and folklore at home in the Pestalozzi tradition which was being introduced at that time. Cartography, geology, botany and agronomy were all interrelated parts of a more holistic understanding of processes within a spatial area. To start with, children learned about their immediate environment (e.g., the school room and the farm), then about the village, and gradually the whole district. As a pupil of Hägerstrand, it is easy for me to recognize parts of this tradition which later became what we today would refer to as an 'integrative perspective'.

Academic career
Hägerstrand entered Lund University in 1937. His 1953 doctoral thesis Innovation Diffusion as a Spatial Process gained fame for its innovative use of Monte Carlo simulation of demographic development. It showed how dynamic, incremental simulation of spatial processes could be used at the spatial scale of the individual as well as large spatial aggregates. Forty years later, geographer Andrew Cliff remarked on the foresight of Hägerstrand's methodology: "Bearing in mind that much of the research upon which the book is based dates from a time when computers were almost nonexistent, let alone used by geographers, it is remarkable that the simulation methodology which is so critically dependent upon computing power should have been contemplated."

Hägerstrand's research was aided by developments at Lund University, notably the establishment of the Siffermaskinen i Lund (SMIL), one of Sweden's first computers. Hägerstrand noted that the Swedish computer scientist Carl-Erik Fröberg, who had been Hägerstrand's "school-mate since secondary school", had introduced him to the Monte Carlo method that would define his doctoral thesis, following a trip by Fröberg and other young Swedish scientists to the United States, a trip that was financed by the Swedish government's project to build its own computer.

In 1969, he presented a paper titled "What about People in Regional Science?" to the European Congress of the Regional Science Association in Copenhagen, Denmark. This paper, published in 1970, developed two concepts:
 The need to study the individual in order to understand social and group practices. Modern cultural geographers commonly now study everyday practices on an individualistic basis, in order to understand larger scale patterns. The study of just groups creates a homogenization of reality and hides the truth.
 A link between space and time that had previously been poorly developed. Historically, social scientists had treated time as a relevant but external factor to spatial features. Hägerstrand's early work on innovation diffusion (studying the geographical spread of new technologies) made him realise that the two, though separate, were not independent of each other; they have what French theorist Henri Lefebvre would call a dialectical relationship.

Legacy
Hägerstrand's initial work was primarily quantitative, which is important as the discipline of geography was, when he published his first paper in 1942, a highly descriptive subject. In the 1950s he was a pioneer of geocoding statistical primary data. He developed models and statistical techniques, such as the time–space cube and time–space prism, which later became important in the development of geographic information systems that process and visualize movement data. His work informed the likes of Allan Pred and Nigel Thrift, who helped take it to the English speaking world.

Hägerstrand's work contributed to the introduction of humanistic thought into geography, which led to the development of critical geography. While his early work was largely quantitative, Hägerstrand's later work paid closer attention to notions of embodiment and emotion. Still, his methods were critiqued by feminist geographer Gillian Rose, who claimed that his models showed a masculine and falsely-ordered view of the world. More recent geographers have tried to combine time geography with the qualitative research and affective phenomenology of feminist geography.

Development of Hägerstrand's work has continued to form part of the basis for non-representational theory, and a reappraisal of his work by new generations of social scientists and biologists means that he remains an influential thinker today. In 2005, Nigel Thrift summarized five benefits of Hägerstrand's time geography for contemporary social science: First, it provides a sense of concreteness, of the power of 'thereness', and it does so in a way—visually—that is still the preserve of too few social theorists. All those intricate diagrams were, in part, an attempt to describe the pragmatics of events, a theme which has now, in the work of writers like Deleuze, become fashionable in the social sciences and humanities but, at the time at which Hägerstrand was working, tended to be restricted to the field of philosophy, except for the work of social interactionists and ethnomethodologists which was often very imperfectly understood by other than a relatively small coterie of enthusiasts. Secondly, Hägerstrand's work was an attack on the Durkheimian idea that space and time were social categories, collective representations which both derived from society and also dictated to society. [...] Time-geography makes it possible to go beyond social constructionism by emphasizing the physical constraints on human action and the wider networks of competing opportunities that they set up which act to steer situations. [...] Thirdly, and as a directly related point, those time-geographic diagrams did something else too. They radically lessened the distinction between humans and other objects. They provided a kind of neutrality of representation, even a democracy of description, of the world. [...] Fourthly, Hägerstrand's work espoused a geographical ethics, centred on the wise use of space and time. Although Hägerstrand would often use economic metaphors to describe that wisdom in the use of space and time, I am sure that he meant something broader and more encompassing which it seems to me to be well worth keeping hold of, a kind of democratic ethos of the cardinal dimensions, a conviviality in the use of space and time. Fifthly, Hägerstrand provided a language which could register the world in different ways. Perhaps one way of looking at Hägerstrand's work is as a means of saying 'hello' in a language many can understand: drawing as a kind of visual Esperanto.

Honors
He received honorary doctorates from University of Bergen, Norwegian school of economics and business administration, Norwegian University of Science and Technology, University of Bristol, University of Edinburgh, University of Glasgow and Ohio State University. The commendation accompanying the honorary degree at Ohio State University noted that "his work on innovation diffusion, carried out in the 1950s and 1960s, continues to be cited as a standard against which current research is measured" and that "this distinguished individual...inspired a generation of scholars around the world."

He was a member of the Royal Swedish Academy of Sciences, the Royal Swedish Academy of Letters, the Royal Swedish Academy of Engineering Sciences, the Norwegian Academy of Science and Letters, the Finnish Academy of Sciences, the American Academy of Arts and Sciences, a Corresponding Fellow of the British Academy, and a member of Société de Géographie in France. He was also one of the founding members of Academia Europaea.

In 1968 Professor Hägerstrand was awarded the Charles P. Daly Medal of the American Geographical Society and in 1968 received an Outstanding Achievement Award from the Association of American Geographers. In 1979 he received the Victoria Medal from the Royal Geographical Society.

In 1992 Torsten Hägerstrand was awarded Lauréat Prix International de Géographie Vautrin Lud, the highest award in the geography research field.

Key publications

See also
 Time geography

Footnotes

References

 
 
 
 
 
 
 
 
 
 
 
 
 
 
 
 
 
 
 
 
 
 
 
 
 
 
 
 
 
  PDF: .

Further reading

External links
 "Torsten Hägerstrand" Encyclopædia Britannica

1916 births
2004 deaths
Swedish geographers
Social geographers
Regional scientists
Fellows of the American Academy of Arts and Sciences
Corresponding Fellows of the British Academy
Members of Academia Europaea
Members of the Finnish Academy of Science and Letters
Members of the Royal Swedish Academy of Engineering Sciences
Members of the Royal Swedish Academy of Sciences
Members of the Norwegian Academy of Science and Letters
Recipients of the Vautrin Lud International Geography Prize
Human geographers
Victoria Medal recipients
20th-century geographers